Mortagonovo (in Bulgarian: Мортагоново) is a village in northern Bulgaria, Razgrad municipality, Razgrad Province. Before 1934 the village was known as Ahmak, Ahmach (in Bulgarian: Ахмак, Ахмач).

References

Villages in Razgrad Province